Vavaʻu 16 is an electoral constituency for the Legislative Assembly in the Kingdom of Tonga. It was established for the November 2010 general election, when the multi-seat regional constituencies for People's Representatives were replaced by single-seat constituencies, electing one representative via the first past the post electoral system. Located in the Vavaʻu island group, it encompasses the villages of Ha’alaufuli, Ta’anea, Ha’akio, Houma, Mangia, Mataika, Feletoa, Leimatu’a, Tu’anekivale, and Holonga. It is one of three constituencies in Vavaʻu. (The number 16 does not mean that it is the fifteenth in Vavaʻu, but in the country.)

Its current representative is Viliami Latu.

Members of Parliament

References

Tongan legislative constituencies
Vavaʻu
2010 establishments in Tonga
Constituencies established in 2010